Boschkapelle is a former village and municipality in the Netherlands. It is now part of the village of Vogelwaarde.

Boschkapelle was home to 375 people in 1840. In 1936, it merged with the municipality of Stoppeldijk to form the new municipality of Vogelwaarde. The two villages however stayed separate, until they merged in about 1970.

References 

Former municipalities of Zeeland
Populated places in Zeeland
Hulst